The women's 200 metres event at the 1975 Pan American Games was held in Mexico City on 14 and 15 October.

Medalists

Results

Heats

Wind:Heat 1: -0.1 m/s, Heat 2: +2.1 m/s, Heat 3: -2.5 m/s, Heat 4: 0.0 m/s

Semifinals

Wind:Heat 1: 0.0 m/s, Heat 2: -1.2 m/s

Final
Wind: 0.0 m/s

References

Athletics at the 1975 Pan American Games
1975